Barney James (11 November 1944 – 11 April 2016) was an English musician, actor and writer. He was known as the drummer with the band Warhorse and for Rick Wakeman. His acting credits include the Derek Jarman films Sebastiane and Jubilee.

Life and career
After a career in the armed forces, James studied percussion in Manchester at the Johnny Roadhouse School of Music and the Northern School of Music. He played with a series of bands including Witnesses, Gracious, Forum, Legend, Warhorse and Rick Wakeman. With Wakeman, James played on Journey to the Centre of the Earth and The Myths and Legends of King Arthur and the Knights of the Round Table.

He later continued to work in the music industry as a session musician with artists including Dusty Springfield, P.J. Proby, Billy Joel, Frank Zappa, Kenny Loggins, John Martyn, Kiki Dee, James Taylor and Herbie Hancock.

James died at the age of 71 at his home in Henley-on-Thames, Oxfordshire, and was survived by two daughters.

References

External links
 Barney James's blog

2016 deaths
English male film actors
English rock drummers
Male actors from Salford
Warhorse (British band) members
1944 births
20th-century English male actors